The 1992 Harvard Crimson football team was an American football team that represented Harvard University during the 1992 NCAA Division I-AA football season. The Crimson finished fifth in the Ivy League.

In their 20th year under head coach Joe Restic, the Crimson compiled a 3–7 record and were outscored 240 to 167. Robb Hirsch was the team captain.

Harvard's 3–4 conference record placed fifth in the Ivy League standings. The Crimson were outscored 143 to 115 by Ivy opponents. 

Harvard played its home games at Harvard Stadium in the Allston neighborhood of Boston, Massachusetts.

Schedule

References

Harvard
Harvard Crimson football seasons
Harvard Crimson football
Harvard Crimson football